"Anywhere for You" is a song by American boy band Backstreet Boys. It was released as the fifth single from their international self-titled debut album in 1997. It was later included on their debut US album as well. This is one of the earlier recordings on their 1996 debut album. The song was written by Wayne Perry and Gary Baker in 1994 and recorded at the end of that year by the group. A Spanish version of the song, titled "Donde Quieras Yo Iré", was recorded in late 1995 in Zürich along with a Spanish version of "I'll Never Break Your Heart".

Critical reception
Alan Jones from Music Week wrote that "Anywhere for You" "is an impeccably performed ballad on which the boys indulge in much vocal interplay. The whole thing is decorated with sweet harmonies and smells like another major hit for the rapidly developing group."

Music video
The accompanying music video for "Anywhere for You" features the band on a beach in Miami Beach, Florida engaging in various recreational activities, such as biking and volleyball. Other shots show them singing the song on the rocks by the water.

Track listings
 CD1, UK
 "Anywhere for You" (Album Version) – 4:40
 "I'll Never Find Someone Like You" – 4:23
 "Donde Quieras Yo Ire (Anywhere for You)" (Spanish version) – 4:50

 CD2, UK
 "Anywhere for You" (Album Version) – 4:40
 "Let's Have a Party" – 3:49
 "We've Got It Goin' On" (Amadin Club Mix) – 6:33

 CD single, Germany
 "Anywhere for You" (Album Version) – 4:40
 "I'll Never Find Someone Like You" – 4:23
 "We've Got It Goin' On" (Marcus Mix) – 6:10
 "Happy Valentine" – 3:30

Credits and personnel
Produced by Veit Renn
Mixed by Chris Trevett at Battery Studios
Recorded by Joe Smith at Parc Studios

Charts

Weekly charts

Year-end charts

References

1995 songs
1997 singles
Backstreet Boys songs
Jive Records singles
Pop ballads
Songs written by Gary Baker (songwriter)
Songs written by Wayne Perry (country music)